Urechești is a commune in Bacău County, Western Moldavia, Romania. It is composed of five villages: Cornățel, Lunca Dochiei, Satu Nou, Slobozia and Urechești.

References

Communes in Bacău County
Localities in Western Moldavia